The 2009 Ohio Valley Conference men's basketball tournament took place March 3, 6, and 7, 2009. The first round was hosted by the better seed in each game, and the semifinals and finals took place at Sommet Center in Nashville, Tennessee.  The tournament was won by the Morehead State Eagles.

Format
The top eight eligible men's basketball teams in the Ohio Valley Conference receive a berth in the conference tournament.  After the 20 game conference season, teams are seeded by conference record.

Bracket

External links
Official site of the Ohio Valley Conference
Official site of the Ohio Valley Conference tournament
Tournament Bracket

Tournament
Ohio Valley Conference men's basketball tournament
Basketball competitions in Nashville, Tennessee
College sports tournaments in Tennessee
Ohio Valley Conference men's basketball tournament
Ohio Valley Conference men's basketball tournament